The 2021 Japanese Super Cup (known as Fuji Xerox Super Cup 2021 for sponsorship reasons) was the 28th Japanese Super Cup since its reestablishment, and the 36th overall. It was held on 20 February 2021 between the 2020 J1 League champions and Emperor's Cup winners Kawasaki Frontale and the league's (and cup) runners-up Gamba Osaka, the third league runners-up to ever qualify for the competition and the first club other than Urawa Red Diamonds to qualify in this way. It took place at the Saitama Stadium 2002, Saitama, Saitama. This was the first Super Cup held after the recognition by the Guinness World Records as Fuji Xerox sponsored the competition for a world record of 27 years, the longest sponsorship of a football super cup.

This was Frontale's third Super Cup appearance overall, all in the previous four years; they only failed to qualify in 2020 and won once in 2019. At the other hand, this was Gamba's seventh Super Cup appearance and their first since 2016, winning twice (in 2007 and 2015).

Frontale took a 2–0 lead from Kaoru Mitoma in the first half before being equalized in the second half. On the last minute of the second half additional time, substitute Yu Kobayashi scored the winner for the double winners and earned them their second Super Cup title. Gamba extended their trophy drought, its most recent title was the 2015 Emperor's Cup.

Match details

References

Japanese Super Cup
Super
Kawasaki Frontale matches
Gamba Osaka matches